Gemini is a fictional character, a supervillain published by DC Comics. She first appeared in Beast Boy #1 (January 2000), and was created by Geoff Johns, Ben Raab, and Justiniano.

Fictional character biography
She is the daughter of Madame Rouge. In the Beast Boy mini-series, she sought revenge against Beast Boy for killing her mother, her insanity having twisted her mother's death as the deliberate fault of Doctor Caulder and Beast Boy when it was merely an accident. She attempted to frame Beast Boy for the murders of his former cast members in an old TV show. After being tracked down by Beast Boy, Gemini reveals the bound and gagged forms of Vicky Valiant and Tim Bender, two of Gar's old co-stars whom she intends to murder. She is thwarted by Beast Boy, Flamebird, and Nightwing (Nightwing having come to investigate the attacks, he saw through her attempt to impersonate Beast Boy as she attacked him when she failed to address Nightwing by his real name during their fight). Subsequently, she joined her mother's old group, the Brotherhood of Evil. Her first mission with them was an arms deal with the Penguin in Blüdhaven, but they were defeated by Batgirl.

In Infinite Crisis, Gemini became a member of the Secret Society of Super Villains. During the One Year Later crossover, Gemini rejoins the Brotherhood of Evil.

Rebirth
In "DC Rebirth" launched continuity, Gemini is pursued by Nightwing out of Blüdhaven for murdering former friends of hers. The Birds of Prey aid him in the chase. She praises a superhuman Blackbird, who has told her to cut ties with her friends and helped her develop her metahuman powers. Gemini falls victim to Blackbird's plan to drain metahumans of their powers. She returns to the Birds, Nightwing and Green Arrow for help, who defeat Blackbird.

Powers and abilities
Gemini's powers are similar to her mother, Madame Rouge. She can take on any shape or form at will, stretch herself like rubber, and have an amorphous physiology. Currently, she has a weakness to fire.

In other media

Film
Gemini was reportedly featured in David S. Goyer's script for an upcoming Green Arrow film project entitled Escape from Super Max. In the script, Gemini appeared as an inmate of the Super Max Penitentiary for Metahumans.

Miscellaneous
 While Gemini was never featured in the Teen Titans animated series, within the spin-off comic series the daughter of Killer Moth began dressing up as the daughters of other villains and committing crimes as them, one of them being Gemini. Her mother, Madame Rouge, was featured in the show's fifth season and was voiced by Hynden Walch. Gemini did eventually appear in issue #48 of the series as a member of the Brotherhood of Justice, an alternate reality version of the Brotherhood of Evil. She took on the identity of Starfire's evil elder sister, Blackfire (a mirror universe version of Starfire herself) in order to infiltrate the Teen Tyrants.

References

External links
 Gemini at Comic Vine

Characters created by Geoff Johns
Comics characters introduced in 2000
DC Comics characters who are shapeshifters
DC Comics female supervillains
DC Comics metahumans
DC Comics orphans
Fictional actors
Fictional amorphous creatures
Fictional French people
Fictional impostors
Fictional characters who can stretch themselves